Namtu Township is a township of Kyaukme District in Shan State, Myanmar. The principal town is Namtu.

References

Townships of Shan State